De Agostini S.p.A. is an Italian holding company that coordinates the strategic operating companies De Agostini Editore, De Agostini Communications, IGT, and DeA Capital, and makes financial investments, among which the main investment is a minority stake in Assicurazioni Generali. It was founded in 1901 by geographer Giovanni De Agostini in Rome, and later moved to Novara.

Overview 
 De Agostini Editore S.p.A. is the sub-holding company active in the publishing sector in 30 countries with publications in 13 languages and organised into areas by product: De Agostini Publishing, DeA Planeta Libri, De Agostini Scuola and Digital De Agostini, as well as Spanish publisher Planeta DeAgostini (a joint venture with Grupo Planeta).
 De Agostini Communications is the media and communication sector sub-holding comprising the Group's interests in content production, broadcasting and distribution of content for television, new media and cinema. DeAgostini owns a 36% stake in the LDH holding which in turns owns 66% of the content producer Banijay Group.
 Shareholder of Atresmedia, the Spanish radio and television group, held in partnership with Spanish Planeta Corporation and listed on the Madrid Stock Exchange, is a co-leader in the Spanish television market. It operates in the following sectors: Atresmedia Televisión, Atresmedia Radio, Atresmedia Digital, Atresmedia Publicidad and Atresmedia Cine.
 Geo4Map: deals with geography and cartography and is a company created in 2009 by geographic and cartographic employees of De Agostini.  As of January 1, 2015, it acquired the entire cartographic and geographic business branch of De Agostini Editore. Geo4Map is the matrix of the Libreria Geografica brand.

See also
 Partwork

References

External links
Corporate site
Publishing site

Publishing companies established in 1901
Publishing companies of Italy
Mass media companies of Italy
Mass media in Novara
Mass media in Rome
Television networks in Italy
Italian-language television networks
Disney comics publishers